The women's coxed four competition at the 1984 Summer Olympics took place at took place at Lake Casitas, California, United States of America.

Competition format

The competition consisted of two main rounds (heats and finals) as well as a repechage. The 9 boats were divided into two heats for the first round, with 5 boats in one heat and 4 in the other. The winner of each heat advanced directly to the "A" final (1st through 6th place). The remaining 7 boats were placed in the repechage. The repechage featured two heats, with 3 boats in one heat and 4 in the other. The top two boats in each of the repechage heats went to the "A" final. The remaining 3 boats (3rd and 4th placers in the repechage heats) competed in the "B" final for 7th through 9th place.

All races were over a 1000 metre course.

Results

Heats

The heats were held on July 30, during calm winds on a warm day (27 °C). The winner of each advanced to the A final, with all others going to the repechage. No boats were eliminated in this round.

Heat 1

There was little drama to this race. The Romanian boat rowed out to an early lead and was never challenged. The Dutch and Americans were close for second place at the halfway mark, but the Dutch pulled away over the second half. The Chinese boat (making the country's Olympic rowing debut) and the South Korean boat (making the country's second Olympic rowing appearance—South Korea had sent a men's eight in 1964) were well behind the other teams.

Heat 2

While there was less distance between first and last in the second heat than the first, it was again not a race where any two boats were particularly close to each other. The Canadians won by over 3 seconds, the Australians took second by more than 4 seconds, and the West Germans finished third by over 1.5 seconds.

Repechage

The repechage was held on August 1, during calm winds on a cooler day than the heats (16 °C vs. 27 °C). The top two boats in each of the two repechage heats advanced to the A final, with all others going to the B final, out of contention for medals.

Repechage heat 1

The Dutch team led early and finished with an easy win, more than 5 seconds ahead. In the competition for the second spot in the "A" final, China could not keep up with West Germany, falling behind by 2 seconds at the halfway mark and unable to close that gap over the last 500 metres.

Repechage heat 2

The second repechage heat was another race with little competitiveness. The Americans won by over 3 seconds, with more than 6 seconds separating second and third places.

Finals

Final B

The "B" final for 7th through 9th places was held on August 3. There was an east-northeast wind at 1.2 m/s on a fairly warm day (23 °C). Great Britain took an early lead of 2.5 seconds through the halfway mark. China, however, pushed them hard in the second half, narrowing the distance to only a half-second win by the British boat. South Korea, as was the case throughout the event, was outclassed by the other teams.

Final A

The main final was held on August 4. The wind was calm again, and the day was cool (18 °C). The heat winners, Romania and Canada, had little difficulty taking gold and silver, respectively; Canada looked to challenge Romania for gold early but could not keep pace. The two teams that had advanced from the second repechage heat battled for the bronze medal, with the Australians winning a tight race with a "last minute push." The Dutch team had actually been in third at the halfway mark before falling back to fifth. The West Germany boat kept close to the others early but eventually finished 5 seconds out of fifth place.

Final classification

References

Rowing at the 1984 Summer Olympics
Women's rowing at the 1984 Summer Olympics